Mitrella floccata is a species of sea snail in the family Columbellidae, the dove snails.

Distribution
This species occurs in the Indian Ocean off Tanzania, Mozambique, and South Africa.

Subspecies
There are two subspecies:
 Mitrella floccata floccata (Reeve, 1859)
 Mitrella floccata hanleyi (Deshayes, 1863) (synonyms: Columbella hanleyi Deshayes, 1863; Columbella robillardi G. B. Sowerby III, 1894; Mitrella hanleyi (Deshayes, 1863))

Description
The shell length varies between 10 mm and 16 mm.

References

 Deshayes, G. P., 1863 Catalogue des mollusques de l‛Ile de la Réunion (Bourbon). In Maillard, L. (Ed.) Notes sur l'Ile de la Réunion (Bourbon), p. 144 p, 14 pls
 Drivas, J. & Jay, M., 1990. The Columbellidae of Reunion Island (Mollusca: Gastropoda). Annals of the Natal Museum 31: 163-200
 Spry, J.F. (1961). The sea shells of Dar es Salaam: Gastropods. Tanganyika Notes and Records 56
 Kilburn R.N. (1970). Taxonomic notes on South African marine mollusca, I. Annals of the Cape Provincial Museums 8(4):39–48
 Kilburn R.N. & Marais J.P. (2010) Columbellidae. pp. 60–104, in: Marais A.P. & Seccombe A.D. (eds), Identification guide to the seashells of South Africa. Volume 1. Groenkloof: Centre for Molluscan Studies. 376 pp.

External links
 Reeve, L. A. (1858–1859). Monograph of the Genus Columbella. In: Conchologia Iconica, or, illustrations of the shells of molluscous animals, vol. 11, pl. 1-37 and unpaginated text.

floccata
Gastropods described in 1859